Seyyed Abbas Salehi is an Iranian scholar, journalist and former Minister of Culture and Islamic Guidance from 2017 to 2021. He was vice-minister from 2013 until 2017 which also served as acting Minister of Culture from 19 October until 1 November 2016. On 20 August 2017, he was confirmed as culture minister in the second administration of Rouhani.

Salehi is a contributor author to the Tafsir Rahnama and has been a member of Qom Seminary's preaching affairs board of trustees.

References 

1964 births
Living people
Iranian journalists
People from Mashhad
Iranian Vice Ministers
Government ministers of Iran